A Good Baby is a 1999 drama film directed by Katherine Dieckmann, making her directorial debut.  The film was produced by Lianne Halfon, Tom Carouso, Aileen Argentini and Derrick Tseng. The screenplay was written by Dieckmann and Leon Rooke. The film stars Henry Thomas played Raymond Toker, a young loner. The other casts were David Strathairn, Cara Seymour, Danny Nelson, Jayne Morgan, Allison Glenn, Jerry Foster, Jerry Rushing, Emilie Jacobs and Hannah Grady.

The film premiered at the 1999 Los Angeles Independent Film Festival.

Plot
A young loner wandering the back roads of North Carolina comes across an abandoned baby. He immediately starts seeking the baby's parents, but starts developing a bond with the child that explores his own isolated roots. In true bad guy fashion, a traveling salesman appears and truths about the baby's origin start to unravel.

References

External links
 

1999 films
American drama films
1999 drama films
Films scored by David Mansfield
Films set in North Carolina
Films shot in North Carolina
1990s English-language films
Films directed by Katherine Dieckmann
1990s American films